Miguel Ángel Luis Gamboa Pedemonte (born June 21, 1951) is a former football striker from Chile.

Career
He represented his native country at the 1982 FIFA World Cup, wearing the number 21 jersey. He also played for several clubs in Chile, including Universidad de Chile and Colo Colo, and in Mexico for Tecos UAG, where he coincided with his compatriot Mario Maldonado, and América.

Post-retirement

Gamboa has coached the Rapanui national football team. He also led the Chile beach soccer team in the 2009 South American Championship, where he called up some retired professional footballers such as Rodrigo Sanhueza, Rodrigo Cuevas, Cristian Olivares,  and Carlos Medina.

He has taken part in friendly matches along with historical players of Universidad de Chile such as Cristián Castañeda, Patricio Mardones, Martín Gálvez, among others.

References

External links

Miguel Ángel Gamboa at PartidosdeLaRoja 
 Weltfussball profile  
 

1951 births
Living people
Footballers from Santiago
Chilean footballers
Chilean expatriate footballers
Chile international footballers
Association football forwards
1982 FIFA World Cup players
1975 Copa América players
Audax Italiano footballers
Lota Schwager footballers
Colo-Colo footballers
Tecos F.C. footballers
Universidad de Chile footballers
Club América footballers
Coyotes Neza footballers
Chilean Primera División players
Liga MX players
Chilean expatriate sportspeople in Mexico
Expatriate footballers in Mexico
Chilean football managers